R. A. M. Golam Muktadir (died 27 November 2020) was a two star rank Bangladesh Army officer and former Director General of Bangladesh Rifles.

Career
He was the Director General of Bangladesh Rifles from 1 July 1982 to 16 July 1985.

References

Director Generals of Border Guards Bangladesh
Bangladesh Army generals
Year of birth missing
2020 deaths